Zevely House is a historic home located at Winston-Salem, Forsyth County, North Carolina.

History 
The Zevely House was built about 1815 by Vannimmen Zively, who married Johanna Sophia Shober in 1809 and bought from his step-father the same year the 160-acre land where he erected the house 6 years later, on Old Town Road. The house was moved in 1974 from its original site at 734 Oak Street to a new site at 901 West Fourth Street.  It was subsequently restored (1974-1975) and houses a restaurant.

It was listed on the National Register of Historic Places in 1973. It is located in the West End Historic District.

Description 
The Zevely House is a two-story, three bay by two bay, brick dwelling in the German-influenced North Carolina Moravian style.  It has a one-story rear shed addition and full-width front entrance porch.

References

External links
Zevely House Restaurant website

Houses on the National Register of Historic Places in North Carolina
Houses completed in 1815
Houses in Forsyth County, North Carolina
National Register of Historic Places in Winston-Salem, North Carolina
Individually listed contributing properties to historic districts on the National Register in North Carolina